The Kakhetian pig is a local pig breed from Kakheti, the eastern province of  Georgia.

External links
 http://www.fao.org/docrep/009/ah759e/AH759E10.htm
 http://www.tiho-hannover.de/einricht/zucht/eaap/descript/948.htm

Pig breeds originating in Georgia (country)